Simone Franchini (born 30 March 1998) is an Italian football player who plays as a midfielder for  club Padova.

Club career

Sassuolo
He is the product of Sassuolo youth teams. He made his debut for Sassuolo's senior team on 3 November 2016 in an 2016–17 UEFA Europa League group stage game against Rapid Wien as an added-time substitute for Grégoire Defrel. He made his first bench appearance in a league game in the 2016–17 Serie A match against Inter on 18 December 2016, and appeared on the bench a handful more times in Serie A and Europa League, but did not see any more playing time for the rest of the season.

Loan to Ternana
On 12 July 2017, he was sent on loan to Serie B club Ternana. He remained on the bench for every Ternana's game, and was eventually recalled to Sassuolo in January 2018. He finished the 2017–18 season in their Under-19 team.

Loan to Reggina
On 6 July 2018, he joined Serie C club Reggina on loan. He made his Serie C debut for Reggina on 18 September 2018 in a game against Trapani as a 71st-minute substitute for Gaetano Navas. He started in the next game against Bisceglie and scored his first goal on 15 October 2018 against Siracusa.

Cesena
On 12 July 2019, he signed a 3-year contract with Cesena.

Piacenza
On 16 January 2020 he moved to Piacenza.

Padova
On 10 September 2020, he signed a 2-year contract with Padova and was immediately loaned to Ravenna for the 2020–21 season.

On 8 August 2021, he was loaned Serie C club Monterosi.

References

External links
 

1998 births
Living people
Sportspeople from Modena
Italian footballers
Association football midfielders
Serie C players
U.S. Sassuolo Calcio players
Ternana Calcio players
Reggina 1914 players
Cesena F.C. players
Piacenza Calcio 1919 players
Calcio Padova players
Ravenna F.C. players
Monterosi Tuscia F.C. players
Footballers from Emilia-Romagna